Triguères is a commune in the Loiret department in north-central France.

Geography
The commune is traversed by the Ouanne River.

History 

Standing on the path from Orléans to Troyes - a major road from prehistoric times until the beginning of 19th century -, Triguères has provided many important prehistoric, Celtic and Roman remnants of its rich past.

Mousterian settlements 

In 1922 a large Mousterian site was discovered at La Garenne.

Celtic times 

A Celtic oppidum over 22 acres wide stood on the hill north of the river, surveilling the « chemin Perré » ("stone path") where flint stones were used according to the Celtic method, and not stone slabs as per the Roman method.

Roman period 

Triguères is a choice candidate for being the Vellaunodunum mentioned by Julius Caesar's in Commentarii de Bello Gallico. The remnants of a large Gallo-Roman town were found in the 1850-1860, notably an amphitheatre, a cemetery in 1857, a source sanctuary at the moulin du Chemin in 1858, Gallo-Roman villas at les Vallées and les Monts, a Gallo-Roman temple, an aqueduct and two public Roman baths.

Greater Triguères entirely disappeared in 451 when Attila passed through the valley, coming from Orléans which he failed to take (his first major drawback in his campaign) and on his way to a full defeat at the battle of the Catalaunian Plains. Triguères waited for six centuries to start its rebirth, and it never recovered its former splendour.

Middle Ages 

Saint Alpais of Cudot and his legend precede Triguères' rebuilding, along with the Christian expansion. Saint-Martin church dates back from the end of the 11th century.

The Chatelet house was built in 1550.

See also

 Communes of the Loiret department

References 
 Notes

 References

Communes of Loiret
Senones